"Could I Leave You?" is a song written by Stephen Sondheim for the 1971 musical Follies for the character Phyllis.

Synopsis
Phyllis sings to her husband about how apathetic she is to her marriage, yet she decides to stay.

Critical reception
Time magazine explained that Sondheim is "still the great chronicler of married life" in all its form - in this song he demonstrates the bitterness of marriage. Backstage described it as "biting contemplation of divorce." Vulture calls the song a "stinging Coward-esque waltz." The New York Times notes "Phyllis’s lacerating assertion of independence to her husband, overflows with both tenderness and hostility."

References

1971 songs
Songs from musicals
Songs written by Stephen Sondheim